Llandilo Bridge railway station served the town of Llandeilo, in the historical county of Carmarthenshire, Wales, from 1865 to 1963 on the Llanelly Railway.

History 
The station was opened on 1 June 1865 by the Llanelly Railway. It was supposed to close on 1 May 1870 but this never materialised, neither did the supposed 1 June closure. It was omitted from Bradshaw in May 1870 and was still absent in June 1871. In the Cambrian timetables, the 1 July 1870 edition showed that the trains stopped at the station but the 8 July edition showed that no trains stopped. The trains were shown stopping again in the 4 August edition. Trains were once again shown as not stopping from 1 April to 1 June 1880. This was due to a dispute with the London North Western Railway. The station closed on 9 September 1963.

References 

Disused railway stations in Carmarthenshire
Railway stations in Great Britain opened in 1865
Railway stations in Great Britain closed in 1963
1865 establishments in Wales
1963 disestablishments in Wales